Orencostoma is a genus of moths of the family Yponomeutidae.

Species
Orencostoma bicornigerum - Moriuti, 1971 

Yponomeutidae